SuperEnalotto is a lottery that has been played in Italy since 3 December 1997. Draws take place on Tuesdays, Thursdays and Saturdays at 8:00 PM. The jackpots won are among the largest in the world, and the odds of winning are one of the lowest in the world.

History
'Enalotto' is a well-known Italian lottery which has existed since the 1950s. In 1997, SISAL modified the 'Enalotto' lottery to create SuperEnalotto.

Until 30 June 2009 the six main winning numbers were taken from the first number drawn in Lottomatica's regional Lotto draws for the cities of Bari, Florence, Milan, Naples, Palermo & Rome (used in that order). The Venice draw was used as a "Jolly" number. If the first number of a city had been used before, then the second of the city's draw was used - and so on. In this system, there was a small probability that the numbers of two cities could be the same - in which case there would have been duplicate numbers and it would have been impossible to win the jackpot.

Playing the game
Tickets cost one Euro for one try. Before February 2016, one received two plays for one Euro.

The object of the game is to match 6 numbers out of 90. Should a player match all of them, he/she wins the jackpot. Besides the jackpot, SuperEnalotto has five prize categories that players can win.

The "Jolly" number gives an additional chance to those who have matched 5 numbers. If they also match the "Jolly" number, they'll win a higher "5+1" prize. The Jolly number only affects the second prize and not the jackpot.

One must match at least 2 numbers to win. The odds of winning for each category are:

The "SuperStar" number is an additional number which costs extra to play. Under the old rules it was taken from the National Lotto draw in Rome (Ruota Nazionale), under the new rules it is drawn in a separate draw independently from the 6 main numbers and the "Jolly" number. This means that the SuperStar number may be the same as another winning number. Matching it can increase the prize money by up to 100-fold or pay out a fixed amount even if the player fails to match any of the six main numbers.

For a nationwide lottery offering prizes in millions, SuperEnalotto is the most difficult game in the world in terms of hitting the jackpot judging by the odds mentioned above. The prize pool currently consists of 60% of sales; up from 34.648% in the previous format.

SuperEnalotto jackpots grow very high because there is no cap on them and no roll down of jackpots. The lottery is also appealing to players because winnings are taxed at only 20% on the excess over 500 euros, with tax withheld at the time of payout and jackpot winners have the option for a lump sum or annuity payment.

When it began the minimum cost (for two tries) was 1600 Italian Lire, rising to 1900 Lire by the time the Euro was introduced in 2002. Today's price, one Euro is equivalent to 1936.27 Lire.

Biggest payoff
The largest jackpot ever won is worth 371,133,424.51€, split between 90 winners, on 16 February 2023.

The largest single-winner jackpot up to date (and second largest jackpot overall) is worth €209,160,441.54 and was hit on 13 August 2019. The winning ticket was sold at a bar in Lodi.

Notes

External links
  Official Website Sisal SuperEnalotto

Lotteries
Gambling in Italy
Gambling companies
Government-owned companies of Italy